Class of 1984 is a 1982 crime action thriller film directed by Mark Lester and co-written by Tom Holland and John Saxton, based on a story by Holland. The film stars Perry King, Merrie Lynn Ross (who also served as co-executive producer), Timothy Van Patten, Lisa Langlois, Stefan Arngrim, Michael J. Fox (credited as Michael Fox in an early role shortly before his breakthrough on the television series Family Ties), and Roddy McDowall.

The film featured various youth fashions of the time, including the punk look and image that was still popular in the early 1980s. The theme song, "I Am the Future", was performed by Alice Cooper. The film also features a performance by Canadian punk band Teenage Head.

Plot
Andrew Norris is the new music teacher at a troubled inner city school. As he arrives on his first day, he meets fellow teacher Terry Corrigan, who is carrying a gun. When Andrew asks about the firearm, Terry assures him he will learn why the protection is necessary. When they enter the school, Andrew is shocked to see everyone scanned by metal detectors and frisked. He spots a student with a straight razor, but the security guards let the kid go because they are so overworked.

The halls of the school are covered with graffiti. Andrew learns he is expected to patrol the halls as a security guard during his off periods. In his first class, a group of five disruptive students are roughhousing and causing trouble. The leader of the gang is Peter Stegman, the only member of the group who is actually registered in that class. They all eventually walk out, and Andrew discovers the rest of the students actually want to learn, especially Arthur, who plays the trumpet, and Deneen, who plays the clarinet.

As Andrew gets to know the school and the area, he decides that he wants to put together an orchestra with his more advanced students. Peter's gang sells drugs and causes all kinds of mayhem, including the death of a student who buys PCP, climbs up a flagpole, and falls off. They follow Andrew home and taunt him one night, spraying a red liquid on his face. Andrew is frustrated,  but the school principal is cynical, and requires absolute proof of the gang's misconduct in order to act. The police act similarly.

At school, Andrew is confronted with more and more evidence of Peter's crimes. The two grow increasingly at odds. Eventually, after Peter kills Terry's animals in his lab, Andrew and Peter wind up in a bathroom alone together. Peter throws himself into a mirror and beats himself, claiming that Andrew attacked him. Trying to clear things up, Andrew visits Peter's mother at home. Frustrated when Peter still plays the victim and his mother will not hear Andrew out, he hotwires Peter's car and drives it into a wall. 

During lunch, the gang starts a food fight and forces their friend Vinnie to stab Arthur, causing him to be sent to a hospital. Vinnie is arrested and held in a youth detention center. Terry is driven insane after the incident with the animals in his lab, and pulls a gun on his students;  he is killed after crashing his car when trying to kill Peter and the others.

Andrew's orchestra is about to give its first concert. As his wife, Diane, gets ready at home, Peter's gang breaks into the house and gang-rapes her. One of them takes a Polaroid of her being raped and has it delivered to Andrew on the podium, just as he is about to start the concert. Horrified by the photo, he runs off the podium in pursuit of Peter's gang; Deneen conducts the orchestra in his absence.

Andrew and the gang chase each other through the school. Andrew kills them off one by one, and finally confronts Peter on the roof. Their last scuffle ends with Peter falling through a skylight and, after Andrew reaches a hand to help him but Peter attacks him, getting strangled to death in the ropes above the stage. His corpse falls into full view of the audience. An ending caption states that Andrew is never charged because the police could not find a witness to the crime.

Cast

Release
Class of 1984 was released in the United States on August 20, 1982.

Censorship
When it was originally released, the film was banned in several countries due to its lewd content. In the United Kingdom, it received four minutes and fourteen seconds of cuts from the British Board of Film Classification, and was refused a video certificate four years later. It was finally passed fully uncut in 2005. In Finland, the theatrical version was banned in 1983 – the case went up to the Supreme Administrative Court – and an edited video release was similarly banned in 1984. In 2006, an uncut DVD release was approved with an "18" rating.

Reception
On Rotten Tomatoes, the film has a rating of 71% based on 21 reviews, with a weighted average of 6.2/10. Metacritic gave the film a score of 49 based on 11 reviews, indicating "mixed or average reviews".

Film historian and critic Leonard Maltin described the movie as an "[u]npleasant, calculatedly campy melodrama. ... Still, not bad as revenge movies go". He further characterized the picture as a loose remake of The Blackboard Jungle, with King, Van Patten, and Fox in the roles of Glenn Ford, Vic Morrow, and Sidney Poitier, respectively.

In the Chicago Sun-Times, Roger Ebert wrote: "Class of 1984 is raw, offensive, vulgar, and violent, but it contains the sparks of talent and wit, and it is acted and directed by people who cared to make it special".

Home media
Shout Factory's horror division Scream Factory released the film as a Collector's Edition Blu-ray on April 14, 2015.

Legacy
Comedy writer and producer Tom Scharpling has noted that Class of 1984 is one of his favorite films. Scharpling would often reference the movie on his weekly call-in radio program The Best Show on WFMU.

Sequels
The film spawned two science fiction sequels. Class of 1999 (1990) was also directed by Mark Lester. Class of 1999 II: The Substitute (1994) was released direct-to-video by Vidmark Entertainment. The three movies have plots only loosely related to each other.

Class of '99
When the musicians Layne Staley and Tom Morello decided to join efforts to record a song for the soundtrack of the movie The Faculty (released December 25, 1998 in North America and 1999 in the rest of the world) they named this supergroup Class of '99.

References

External links
 
 
 

1982 films
1982 action thriller films
1982 independent films
1980s crime action films
1980s crime thriller films
1980s English-language films
1980s high school films
American action thriller films
American crime action films
American crime thriller films
American high school films
American independent films
American rape and revenge films
Canadian action thriller films
Canadian crime action films
Canadian crime thriller films
Canadian films about revenge
Canadian independent films
English-language Canadian films
Films about educators
Films about neo-Nazis
Films about school violence
Films directed by Mark L. Lester
Films scored by Lalo Schifrin
Films set in 1984
Films shot in Toronto
Punk films
Teen action films
Teen crime films
Teen thriller films
Teensploitation
1980s American films
1980s Canadian films